Gould Island lies east of Conanicut Island in Narragansett Bay in the U.S. state of Rhode Island.

History
The Narragansett Indians named the island "Aquopimokuk", and Colonist Thomas Gould purchased it from them in 1657. Gould sold the island to Thomas Cranston, and later owners included the Carr family and Joseph Wanton, Jr., who lost the property for having Loyalist sympathies during the American Revolution. British naval leader Captain Wallace constructed a military fort on the island called "Owl's Nest" in 1778 during the American Revolution. In 1803, Caleb Gardner purchased the forfeited island. It remained privately owned until the early twentieth century.

A lighthouse was built on the island in 1889 which was demolished in 1960. Richard L. Howell purchased the island in 1909, and his daughter and son-in-law Percy D. Haughton inherited it along with the McKim, Mead, and White house. Percy Haughton was Harvard College's football coach, and he used the island for training the football team.

In 1919, the U.S. Navy requisitioned the entire island from the Haughton family to expand its nearby torpedo station on Goat Island. They constructed an airbase with hangars and a seaplane landing site for naval torpedo planes. The airfield was discontinued in the 1950s. As of 2009, the State of Rhode Island owns part of the island as a wildlife sanctuary, while the Navy and Naval Undersea Warfare Center still own and utilize the remainder of it.

References

 Gould Island: Block 2066, Census Tract 413, Newport County, Rhode Island United States Census Bureau

Islands of Newport County, Rhode Island
Jamestown, Rhode Island
Islands of Narragansett Bay
Nature reserves in Rhode Island
Buildings and structures in Newport County, Rhode Island
Defunct airports in Rhode Island
Forts in Rhode Island
Military installations in Rhode Island
Protected areas of Newport County, Rhode Island
Transportation in Newport County, Rhode Island
Islands of Rhode Island